Le Grand Township is a township in Marshall County, Iowa, USA.

History
Le Grand Township was established in 1855.

References

Townships in Marshall County, Iowa
Townships in Iowa